Pamela Margaret Elizabeth Berry, Baroness Hartwell (née Smith; 16 May 1914 – 7 January 1982), was an English socialite, known for her political salon. She was part of the Bright Young Things crowd, and Cecil Beaton wrote an entry about her in his The Book of Beauty. She became one of Britain's museum leaders.

Born in London, the youngest child of F. E. Smith, 1st Earl of Birkenhead, and Margaret Eleanor Furneaux, daughter of academic Henry Furneaux, she was called Lady Pamela. When she was still in her teens, Cecil Beaton wrote of her and her sister Eleanor in The Book of Beauty, "Pamela is like the little Robinetta of Sir Joshua Reynolds with the thrush on her raised shoulder."

In 1936, she married Michael Berry who held positions at London newspapers, as editor-in-chief and chairman of The Sunday Telegraph and The Daily Telegraph. He was briefly 3rd Viscount Camrose before disclaiming the title. The couple had four children: Adrian Berry, 4th Viscount Camrose (1937–2016), Hon. Nicholas William Berry (1942–2016), Hon. Harriet Mary Margaret Berry (b. 1944), and Hon. Eleanor Agnes Berry (b. 1950).

Lady Pamela's interest in American politics led her to observing presidential candidates, traveling along with them on planes and buses after the 1950s. In the 1970s, she sat on the Victoria and Albert Museum's advisory council (1973 to 1978) and was chairman of the British Museum Society for four years before becoming a trustee of the museum in 1979. She also presided over the Incorporated Society of London Fashion Designers and was active in the British section of the Franco-British Council, working to promote British fashions internationally. She died on 7 January 1982.

References

External links
 

1914 births
1982 deaths
Pamela
Hartwell
English socialites
Daughters of British earls
Spouses of life peers
Trustees of the British Museum